Sary Matnorotin (born 5 October 1996 in Cambodia) is a Cambodian footballer.

U-22 Career
He scored his first U-22 goal in 2016 AFC U-23 Championship qualification against North Korea U-22 on 29 March 2015, despite of losing 4–1.

International career
Sary Matnorotin made his international debut in a Friendly Match against Bhutan on 20 August 2015.

References

External links
 

1996 births
Living people
Cambodian footballers
Cambodia international footballers
Association football forwards
Phnom Penh Crown FC players
Nagaworld FC players